Kotri Junction railway station is located in Kotri city, Jamshoro district of Sindh province, Pakistan.

History
Kotri Junction station is among the oldest railway stations in Pakistan. It served as the northern terminus point of the Scinde Railway, which was established in March 1855. A railway line was to be constructed between Karachi and Kotri and work on the Karachi terminus commenced in April 1858. By 13 May 1861, the station opened to the public. This was the first railway line for public traffic between Karachi and Kotri, a distance of 108 miles (174 km).

Services
The following trains stop at Kotri Junction station:

See also
 List of railway stations in Pakistan
 Pakistan Railways

References

Railway stations in Jamshoro District
Railway stations on Hyderabad–Badin Branch Line
Railway stations on Kotri–Attock Railway Line (ML 2)
Railway stations on Karachi–Peshawar Line (ML 1)